This is a list of the Spanish PROMUSICAE Top 20 Singles number-ones of 1988.

Chart history

See also
1988 in music
List of number-one hits (Spain)
 List of number-one singles of the 1980s in Spain

References

1988
Spain Singles
Number-one singles